Kirky may refer to:
Kirkintilloch, a town in Dunbartonshire, Scotland
Kirkliston, a town in West Lothian, Scotland
Nqwebasaurus, a genus of dinosaur which was nicknamed "Kirky" before receiving its scientific name